Schizomus nidicola is a species of short-tailed whipscorpions of the genus Schizomus that belong to the family Hubbardiidae of Arachnids.

References 

Schizomida
Animals described in 1969